Jacob Gonzalez may refer to:

Jacob Gonzalez (first baseman) (born 1998), American baseball first baseman
Jacob Gonzalez (shortstop) (born 2002), American baseball shortstop